The Sex Discrimination Act may refer to:

Sex Discrimination Act 1975, in the UK
Sex Discrimination (Election Candidates) Act 2002, in the UK
Sex Discrimination Act 1984, in Australia
The Sex Disqualification (Removal) Act 1919 in the United Kingdom.